The 2009 Victorian Football League (VFL) was the 128th season of the Australian Rules Football competition. The premiership was won by the North Ballarat Football Club, which defeated the Northern Bullants by 23 points in the Grand Final on 25 September. It was North Ballarat's second consecutive premiership, and the second in the club's history.

League membership and affiliations
At the end of the 2008 season, the Tasmanian Devils Football Club withdrew from the VFL and disbanded. AFL Tasmania, which operated the club, was focussed on re-establishing the Tasmanian Football League as a statewide competition in 2009, after an eight-year hiatus since the original statewide league's collapse at the end of 2000, and having the Tasmanian VFL club competing for attention and players did not fit with this vision. As a result, the VFL was reduced to thirteen clubs.

Additionally, two pairs of VFL-AFL reserves affiliations were altered:
 ended its nine-year affiliation with Sandringham and entered a new affiliation with the Casey Scorpions.
 ended its eight-year affiliation with the Casey Scorpions and entered a new affiliation with Sandringham.

As a result, the size of the VFL was reduced to thirteen teams: nine VFL-AFL affiliates, two AFL reserves team, and two stand-alone VFL teams.

Ladder

Finals series

Awards 
The Jim 'Frosty' Miller Medal was won by Nick Sautner (Sandringham) for the ninth time in his career. Sautner kicked 71 goals for the season.
The J. J. Liston Trophy was by Myles Sewell (North Ballarat), who polled 18 votes. Sewell finished ahead of Michael Barlow (Werribee), who was second with 16 votes, and James Podsiadly (Geelong) and Sam Iles (Box Hill), who were equal third with 15 votes.
The Fothergill-Round Medal was won by Michael Barlow (Werribee).
Box Hill won the reserves premiership. Box Hill 16.18 (114) defeated Sandringham 13.6 (84) in the Grand Final, held as a curtain-raiser to the seniors second preliminary final on 20 September.

Notable events
The Bendigo Bombers could not play at their home ground Queen Elizabeth Oval after May because the surface was deemed unfit for VFL football. Bendigo's remaining home games were transferred to Windy Hill, the training ground of its AFL-affiliate .
The VFL introduced the "23rd man rule". Under the rule, the size of the playing squad was increased to twenty-three (still with eighteen players on the field, but increasing the size of the interchange bench from four to five), provided the 23rd player was a top-age player currently in the TAC Cup, or an undrafted player who had played in the TAC Cup during the previous year. The rule was designed to provide additional senior football opportunities to promising juniors, and improve the alignments between VFL clubs and their TAC Cup affiliates.

See also
 List of VFA/VFL premiers
 Australian Rules Football
 Victorian Football League
 Australian Football League
 2009 AFL season

References

External links
AFL Victoria website
Official VFL website
Unofficial VFL website

Victorian Football League seasons
VFL